Skin is the fifth studio album by The Rainmakers, released in 1996.

Track listing 
All tracks written by Bob Walkenhorst except where noted.

 "Different Rub" – 3:37
 "Skin" – 1:54
 "Good Sons and Daughters" – 5:01
 "Remember Me By" – 4:15
 "Did You See the Lightning" (Steve Phillips) – 4:10
 "Reddleman Coming" – 4:27
 "A Million Miles Away" – 5:42
 "Too Many Twenties" – 3:37
 "Hunger Moon" (Steve Phillips & Pat Tomek) – 4:07
 "Siamese Twins" – 2:48
 "Tattoo" – 4:27
 "Eclipse Has Begun" – 4:28
 "To the Hum" – 3:28

Personnel

The Rainmakers 
Bob Walkenhorst – lead vocals, guitar
Steve Phillips – guitar, vocals
Pat Tomek – drums
Michael Bliss – bass guitar, vocals

Additional musicians 
Mark "Buzzz" Collins – bass guitar on "Too Many Twenties"
Ron Roberts – acoustic bass on "Tattoo"

Notes 

1996 albums
Mercury Records albums
The Rainmakers (band) albums